Foster-Meeker House is a historic home located at Westhampton Beach in Suffolk County, New York. It was built about 1750 and is a classic Long Island, Cape Cod-type dwelling.  It is a one-story, five bay, center-door dwelling whose compact massing is characteristic of mid-18th century construction. It was acquired by the Westhampton Beach Historical Society in 2008 and moved to its present location to prevent demolition.

It was added to the National Register of Historic Places in 2009.

References

External links
 Westhampton Beach Historical Society
 Article about the house

Houses on the National Register of Historic Places in New York (state)
Houses completed in 1750
Houses in Suffolk County, New York
National Register of Historic Places in Suffolk County, New York